The 1908 North Carolina A&M Aggies football team represented the North Carolina College of Agriculture and Mechanic Arts—now known as North Carolina State University—as an independent during the 1908 college football season. Led by second-year head coach Mickey Whitehurst, the Aggies compiled a record of 6–1.

Schedule

References

North Carolina AandM
NC State Wolfpack football seasons
North Carolina AandM Aggies football